
Year 344 BC was a year of the pre-Julian Roman calendar. At the time it was known as the Year of the Consulship of Rutilus and Torquatus (or, less frequently, year 410 Ab urbe condita). The denomination 344 BC for this year has been used since the early medieval period, when the Anno Domini calendar era became the prevalent method in Europe for naming years.

Events 
 By place 

 Persian Empire 
 The king of Caria, Idrieus, dies, leaving the Persian satrapy, by his will, to his sister Ada, to whom he was married.

 Greece 
 The Athenian statesman, Demosthenes, travels to Peloponnesus, in order to detach as many cities as possible from Macedon's influence, but his efforts are generally unsuccessful. Most of the Peloponnesians see Philip II as the guarantor of their freedom, so they send a joint embassy to Athens to express their grievances against Demosthenes' activities. In response to these complaints, Demosthenes delivers the Second Philippic, which is a vehement attack against Philip II.

 Sicily 
 The aristocracy of Syracuse appeal to their mother city of Corinth against their tyrant Dionysius II. The Corinthian general Timoleon is chosen to lead a liberation force to Sicily. Landing at Tauromenium (Taormina) on March 21st, Timoleon faces two armies, one under Dionysius and the other under Hicetas (tyrant of nearby Leontini), who has also called in Carthaginian forces. By shrewd tactics Timoleon defeats his enemies and occupies Syracuse.
 Dionysius II goes into exile once more after the successful invasion by Timoleon of Corinth.

 By topic 

 Science 
 The Greek philosopher and scientist, Aristotle, travels from Assus to Lesbos to study natural history, especially marine biology.

Births

Deaths 
 Idrieus, king of Caria

References